The 1987 European Cup Winners' Cup Final was a football match contested between Ajax of Netherlands and 1. FC Lokomotive Leipzig of East Germany. It was the final match of the 1986–87 European Cup Winners' Cup and the 27th European Cup Winners' Cup final. The final was held at Olympic Stadium in Athens, Greece. Ajax won the match 1–0 with a 20th-minute header from Marco van Basten.

Route to the final

Match

Details

See also
1986–87 European Cup Winners' Cup
1987 European Cup Final
1987 UEFA Cup Final
AFC Ajax in international football competitions

References

External links
UEFA Cup Winners' Cup results at Rec.Sport.Soccer Statistics Foundation

3
1987
AFC Ajax matches
1. FC Lokomotive Leipzig matches
1987
1986–87 in East German football
1986–87 in Dutch football
May 1987 sports events in Europe
1980s in Athens
Sports competitions in Athens